Cyperus polystachyos, also known as Pycreus polystachyos, and also called manyspike flatsedge in the US, or bunchy sedge, coast flatsedge, many-spiked sedge or Texas sedge in Australia, is a herbaceous species in the family Cyperaceae, widespread in tropical and subtropical areas around the world, sometimes extending its range into temperate regions.

Description
It blooms between summer and winter and produces green-brown flowers. Stems are glabrous with a triangular cross-section. The seed-head is an irregular cluster formation at the tip of the stem with brown spikes that have three to six green leafy bracts underneath.

Distribution
It is common in the Neotropics as a weed in grass lawns.

The species is found along rivers and creeks in a range of ecosystems from rainforest, melaleuca forest, vine thickets, eucalypt forest and swamps in a variety of woodland and grassland areas including in salty mud and marshes of the ocean shore.

In Australia the species is found mostly in coastal location, north of Perth in Western Australia and through the Northern Territory, Queensland and New South Wales.

In the United States, it has been reported from a region stretching from Texas to Maine.

See also
 List of Cyperus species

References

polystachyos
Flora of Africa
Flora of North America
Flora of South America
Flora of Asia
Flora of Madagascar
Flora of Australia
Plants described in 1773
Taxa named by Christen Friis Rottbøll